Dashain Aayo, also known as Kodo Fulyo Barima, is a Nepalese song from the film Muglan, which was released in 2005. The song depicts the celebration of the biggest Hindu festival in Nepal, Dashain. It is regarded as an evergreen Dashain song, and is still prominent among Nepali people, especially during the celebration of Dashain. It was sung by Udit Narayan, Deepa Jha, Narayan Lama, and Juna Prasai. The lyrics were written by Loknath Sapkota and the music was composed by Suresh Adhikari. 

The song depicts not only the festival celebration but also the joy experienced when a family member who has been working abroad for a long period of time comes back home to join in the festivities. More than 150,000 audio cassettes were sold, which was one of the highest of its time. This song is considered one of the major contributors behind the film's success.

References

External links 
 

Nepalese songs
2005 songs
Nepali-language songs